The Civic Action Front of Chad (FACT) was a short-lived political alliance in Chad.

History
FACT was formed as an alliance of the Chadian Progressive Party and the Independent Socialist Party of Chad, and was initially named the "Front for the Defence of Civic Rights", but was renamed as the Civic Action Front on 19 May, just eleven days before the 1952 Territorial Assembly elections. The alliance put up electoral lists in five of the ten second college constituencies, winning six of the 30 seats, with the remaining 24 won by the Chadian Democratic Union.

References

Defunct political parties in Chad
Political party alliances in Chad
Political parties with year of establishment missing
Political parties with year of disestablishment missing